CDNC may refer to:
California Digital Newspaper Collection, a Californian newspaper archive
Chinese Domain Name Consortium, a Chinese collaboration to come up with a method for allowing Chinese characters in domain names